Wetzikon is a railway station in the Swiss canton of Zürich and municipality of Wetzikon. The station is located on both the Wallisellen to Rapperswil via Uster and Effretikon to Hinwil railway lines, which converge at junctions to the north and south of the station.

History 
The station was opened in 1857, at the same time as the Uster to Rapperswil section of the Wallisellen to Rapperswil line. It became a junction station in 1876, when the Effretikon to Hinwil line opened.

In 1903, Wetzikon station also became the interchange point with the Wetzikon-Meilen-Bahn (WMB), a newly built metre gauge electric tramway that linked the area with Meilen on the shores of Lake Zürich. The WMB originally ran beyond Meilen station, to terminate at Kempten, but this section closed in 1939 leaving the station as the line's terminus. The WMB closed in 1950.

Services 
Wetzikon is served by Zürich S-Bahn routes S5, S14 and S15, operating from Zürich via Uster, and by route S3, operating from Zürich via Effretikon. The S3 terminates at Wetzikon, whilst the S14 continues to Hinwil, and the S5 and S15 continue to Pfäffikon SZ and Rapperswil, respectively. During weekends, there is also a nighttime S-Bahn service (SN5) offered by ZVV.

Summary of all S-Bahn services:

 Zürich S-Bahn:
 : half-hourly service to  via , and to  via .
 Nighttime S-Bahn (only during weekends):

References

External links 

Wetzikon station on Swiss Federal Railway's web site

Railway stations in the canton of Zürich
Swiss Federal Railways stations
Wetzikon